This is a list of moths of the family Crambidae that are found in South Africa. It also acts as an index to the species articles and forms part of the full List of moths of South Africa.

Achyra coelatalis (Walker, 1859)
Achyra nudalis (Hübner, 1796)
Adelpherupa typicosta (Meyrick, 1933)
Aethaloessa floridalis (Zeller, 1852)
Afroscoparia contemptalis (Walker, 1866)
Agathodes incoloralis (Hampson, 1918)
Agathodes modicalis Guenée, 1854
Agathodes musivalis Guenée, 1854
Agathodes ostentalis (Geyer, 1837)
Agrotera citrina Hampson, 1898
Agrotera fumosa Hampson, 1898
Alphacrambus prodontellus (Hampson, 1919)
Alphacrambus razowskii (Błeszyński, 1961)
Ambia chalcichroalis Hampson, 1906
Ambia melanalis Hampson, 1906
Anania aurea (Butler, 1875)
Anania fusalis (Hampson, 1912)
Anania impunctata (Warren, 1897)
Ancylolomia caffra Zeller, 1877
Ancylolomia capensis Zeller, 1852
Ancylolomia castaneata Hampson, 1919
Ancylolomia lentifascialis Hampson, 1919
Ancylolomia melanella Hampson, 1919
Ancylolomia mirabilis Wallengren, 1876
Ancylolomia pectinifera Hampson, 1910
Ancylolomia perfasciata Hampson, 1919
Ancylolomia planicosta Martin, 1956
Ancylolomia prepiella Hampson, 1919
Ancylolomia simplella de Joannis, 1913
Angustalius hapaliscus (Zeller, 1852)
Angustalius malacellus (Duponchel, 1836)
Anomocrambus homerus Błeszyński, 1961
Antigastra catalaunalis (Duponchel, 1833)
Antigastra morysalis (Walker, 1859)
Archernis flavidalis Hampson, 1908
Argentochiloides meridionalis Bassi, 1999
Argyractis capensis Hampson, 1906
Argyractis nyasalis Hampson, 1917
Argyractis nymphulalis Hampson, 1906
Argyractis pentopalis Hampson, 1906
Argyractis periopis Hampson, 1910
Argyractis sambesica (Strand, 1909)
Aurotalis nigrisquamalis (Hampson, 1919)
Aurotalis similis Bassi, 1999
Autocharis albiplaga (Hampson, 1913)
Autocharis fessalis (Swinhoe, 1886)
Autocharis jacobsalis (Marion & Viette, 1956)
Autocharis sinualis (Hampson, 1899)
Blepharucha zaide (Stoll, 1790)
Bocchoris inspersalis (Zeller, 1852)
Bocchoris nuclealis de Joannis, 1927
Bocchoris onychinalis (Guenée, 1854)
Botyodes asialis Guenée, 1854
Bradina admixtalis (Walker, 1859)
Bradina fasciculalis (Zeller, 1852)
Brihaspa chrysostomus (Zeller, 1852)
Cadarena sinuata (Fabricius, 1781)
Caffrocrambus alcibiades Błeszyński, 1961
Caffrocrambus decolorelloides Błeszyński, 1970
Caffrocrambus decolorellus (Walker, 1863)
Caffrocrambus dichotomellus (Hampson, 1919)
Caffrocrambus endoxantha (Hampson, 1919)
Caffrocrambus leucofascialis (Janse, 1922)
Caffrocrambus ochreus Błeszyński, 1970
Caffrocrambus undilineatus (Hampson, 1919)
Calamochrous flavimarginalis Hampson, 1913
Calamoschoena stictalis Hampson, 1919
Calamotropha abjectella Snellen, 1872
Calamotropha anticella (Walker, 1866)
Calamotropha argenteociliella Pagenstecher, 1893
Calamotropha bradleyi Błeszyński, 1960
Calamotropha diakonoffi Błeszyński, 1961
Calamotropha discellus (Walker, 1863)
Calamotropha heliocaustus (Wallengren, 1876)
Calamotropha paludella (Hübner, 1824)
Calamotropha stachi Błeszyński, 1961
Calamotropha torpidellus (Zeller, 1852)
Calamotropha tripartitus (Hampson, 1919)
Calamotropha wallengreni Błeszyński, 1961
Calamotropha xanthypa Błeszyński, 1961
Cangetta albiceps (Hampson, 1917)
Cataclysta nyasalis Hampson, 1917
Cataclysta perirrorata Hampson, 1917
Charltona plurivittalis Hampson, 1910
Charltona tritonella (Hampson, 1898)
Chilo argyropasta (Hampson, 1919)
Chilo orichalcociliella (Strand, 1911)
Chilo partellus (Swinhoe, 1885)
Chilo phaeosema Martin, 1958
Chilo prophylactes (Meyrick, 1936)
Chilo recalvus Wallengren, 1876
Chrysocatharylla fusca Bassi, 1999
Chrysocatharylla lucasi Schouten, 1994
Chrysocatharylla oenescentellus (Hampson, 1896)
Circobotys caffralis (Hampson, 1910)
Cirrhochrista argentiplaga Warren, 1897
Cirrhochrista grabczewskyi E. Hering, 1903
Classeya argyrodonta (Hampson, 1910)
Classeya trichelites (Meyrick, 1936)
Cnaphalocrocis poeyalis (Boisduval, 1833)
Cornifrons albidiscalis Hampson, 1916
Cotachena octoguttalis (Felder & Rogenhofer, 1875)
Cotachena smaragdina (Butler, 1875)
Crambus archimedes Błeszyński, 1961
Crambus argyrostola (Hampson, 1919)
Crambus bellissimus Błeszyński, 1961
Crambus ellipticellus Hampson, 1919
Crambus lacteella Janse, 1922
Crambus leucoschalis Hampson, 1898
Crambus sectitermina Hampson, 1910
Crambus sjoestedti Aurivillius, 1910
Crambus sparsellus Walker, 1866
Crambus tenuistriga Hampson, 1898
Crambus themistocles Błeszyński, 1961
Crambus uniformella Janse, 1922
Crambus viettellus Błeszyński & Collins, 1962
Crambus xebus Błeszyński, 1962
Criophthona aridalis Hampson, 1913
Criophthona sabulosalis Hampson, 1910
Crocidolomia pavonana (Fabricius, 1794)
Crypsiptya ruficostalis (Hampson, 1918)
Culladia achroellum (Mabille, 1900)
Culladia inconspicuellus (Snellen, 1872)
Culladia serranella Błeszyński, 1970
Culladiella sinuimargo (Hampson, 1919)
Cybalomia squamosa (Hampson, 1913)
Daulia auriplumbea (Warren, 1914)
Daulia subaurealis (Walker, 1865)
Desmia argyrosticta (Hampson, 1910)
Deuterophysa grisealis Hampson, 1917
Diaphana indica (Saunders, 1851)
Diasemia disjectalis (Zeller, 1852)
Diasemia monostigma Hampson, 1913
Diasemia trigonialis Hampson, 1913
Diasemiopsis ramburialis (Duponchel, 1834)
Diastictis incisalis (Snellen, 1880)
Diastictis tenera (Butler, 1883)
Dipleurinodes phaeopalpia (Hampson, 1917)
Dolicharthria bruguieralis (Duponchel, 1833)
Dolicharthria desertalis (Hampson, 1907)
Dolicharthria lanceolalis (Guenée, 1854)
Dolicharthria paediusalis (Walker, 1859)
Dolicharthria signatalis (Zeller, 1852)
Donacaula ignitalis (Hampson, 1919)
Donacaula phaeopastalis (Hampson, 1919)
Duponchelia fovealis Zeller, 1847
Dysallacta negatalis (Walker, 1859)
Elophila africalis (Hampson, 1906)
Elophila circealis (Walker, 1859)
Epascestria argyrostacta (Hampson, 1910)
Epascestria croesusalis (Hampson, 1913)
Epascestria distictalis (Hampson, 1913)
Epascestria euprepialis (Hampson, 1913)
Epascestria microdontalis (Hampson, 1913)
Epascestria pictalis (Hampson, 1913)
Epipagis cancellalis (Zeller, 1852)
Epipagis roseocinctalis (Hampson, 1913)
Euchromius discopis (Hampson, 1919)
Euchromius klimeschi Błeszyński, 1961
Euchromius mythus Błeszyński, 1970
Euchromius nigrobasalis Schouten, 1988
Euchromius ocellea (Haworth, 1811)
Euclasta bacescui Popescu-Gorj & Constantinescu, 1977
Euclasta pauli Popescu-Gorj & Constantinescu, 1973
Euclasta varii Popescu-Gorj & Constantinescu, 1973
Euclasta warreni Distant, 1892
Eudonia gracilineata Nuss, 2000
Eurrhyparodes bracteolalis (Zeller, 1852)
Eurrhyparodes tricoloralis (Zeller, 1852)
Eusabena miltochristalis (Hampson, 1896)
Evergestis africalis (Guenée, 1854)
Evergestis forficalis (Linnaeus, 1758)
Filodes costivitralis Guenée, 1862
Ghesquierellana hirtusalis (Walker, 1859)
Glaucocharis natalensis (Hampson, 1919)
Glaucocharis subnatalensis (Błeszyński, 1970)
Glyphodes aniferalis Hampson, 1909
Glyphodes basifascialis Hampson, 1898
Glyphodes bicolor (Swainson, 1821)
Glyphodes bitriangulalis Gaede, 1917
Glyphodes capensis (Walker, 1866)
Glyphodes chrysialis (Stoll, 1790)
Glyphodes praefulgida Hering, 1903
Glyphodes pyloalis Walker, 1859
Glyphodes quadrinalis (Guenée, 1854)
Glyphodes shafferorum Viette, 1987
Glyphodes stolalis Guenée, 1854
Haimbachia aculeata (Hampson, 1903)
Haimbachia albiceps (Hampson, 1919)
Haimbachia fuscicilia (Hampson, 1910)
Haimbachia proaraealis (Błeszyński, 1961)
Haimbachia unipunctalis (Hampson, 1919)
Haritalodes derogata (Fabricius, 1775)
Heliothela ophideresana (Walker, 1863)
Hellula undalis (Fabricius, 1781)
Herpetogramma licarsisalis (Walker, 1859)
Herpetogramma mutualis (Zeller, 1852)
Herpetogramma phaeopteralis (Guenée, 1854)

Hodebertia testalis (Fabricius, 1794)
Hyalobathra charopalis Swinhoe, 1907
Hyalobathra metallogramma Meyrick, 1934
Hyalobathra retinalis (Saalmüller, 1879)
Hydriris ornatalis (Duponchel, 1832)
Hymenia perspectalis (Hübner, 1796)
Hymenoptychis sordida Zeller, 1852
Ischnurges lancinalis (Guenée, 1854)
Ischnurges rhodographalis Hampson, 1913
Knysna jansei Bassi, 1999
Lamprophaia ablactalis (Walker, 1859)
Lamprosema hottentota Hampson, 1918
Lamprosema ommatalis (Hampson, 1912)
Leonardo davincii Błeszyński, 1965
Leucinodes longipalpis (Warren, 1892)
Leucinodes orbonalis Guenée, 1854
Leucinodes translucidalis Gaede, 1917
Leucinodes vagans (Tutt, 1890)
Loxophantis pretoriella Błeszyński, 1970
Loxostege frustalis (Zeller, 1852)
Loxostege lacunalis (Zeller, 1852)
Loxostege oblinalis (Felder & Rogenhofer, 1875)
Loxostege plumbatalis (Zeller, 1852)
Loxostege venustalis (Cramer, 1782)
Luma flavimarginalis Hampson, 1907
Luma holoxantha Hampson, 1907
Lygropia anaemicalis Hampson, 1912
Lygropia atrinervalis Hampson, 1910
Lygropia nigricornis Hampson, 1898
Lygropia pogonodes Hampson, 1912
Lygropia straminea Hampson, 1912
Lygropia tetraspilalis Hampson, 1912
Marasmia binalis (Zeller, 1852)
Maruca vitrata (Fabricius, 1787)
Marwitzia dichocrocis (Hampson, 1913)
Marwitzia polystidzalis (Hampson, 1918)
Metasia eremialis Hampson, 1913
Metasia holoxanthia Hampson, 1899
Metasia profanalis (Walker, 1865)
Metasia sinuifera Hampson, 1913
Metoeca foedalis (Guenée, 1854)
Mimorista pulchellalis Dyar, 1922
Nausinoe geometralis (Guenée, 1854)
Nausinoe piabilis (Wallengren, 1875)
Neargyria persimilis Hampson, 1919
Neostege holoxutha Hampson, 1910
Noctuelia annuliferalis Hampson, 1913
Nomophila africana Munroe, 1973
Nomophila brevispinalis Munroe, 1973
Nomophila incognita Viette, 1959
Nomophila noctuella ([Denis & Schiffermüller], 1775)
Noorda blitealis Walker, 1859
Notarcha cassualis (Walker, 1859)
Notarcha muscerdalis (Zeller, 1852)
Notarcha obrinusalis (Walker, 1859)
Notarcha quaternalis (Zeller, 1852)
Notarcha temeratalis (Zeller, 1852)
Obtusipalpis pardalis Hampson, 1896
Omiodes indicata (Fabricius, 1775)
Orphanostigma abruptalis (Walker, 1859)
Orphanostigma fervidalis (Zeller, 1852)
Orphanostigma latimarginalis (Walker, 1859)
Ostrinia erythrialis (Hampson, 1913)
Pagyda salvalis Walker, 1859
Palpita actorionalis (Walker, 1859)
Palpita bonjongalis (Plötz, 1880)
Palpita claralis (Walker, 1865)
Palpita elealis (Walker, 1859)
Palpita lobisignalis (Hampson, 1918)
Palpita metallata (Fabricius, 1781)
Palpita prolausalis (Walker, 1859)
Palpita stenocraspis (Butler, 1898)
Palpita subjectalis (Lederer, 1863)
Palpita unionalis (Hübner, 1796)
Paracatalysta fuscalis (Hampson, 1896)
Parapoynx affinialis Guenée, 1854
Parapoynx diminutalis (Snellen, 1880)
Parapoynx fluctuosalis (Zeller, 1852)
Parapoynx stagnalis (Zeller, 1852)
Paratraea obliquivalis (Hampson, 1918)
Pardomima callixantha Martin, 1955
Pardomima furcirenalis (Hampson, 1918)
Pardomima phalarota (Meyrick, 1933)
Pardomima zanclophora Martin, 1955
Parerupa africana (Aurivillius, 1910)
Parotis baldersalis (Walker, 1859)
Parotis prasinalis (Saalmüller, 1880)
Parotis prasinophila (Hampson, 1912)
Parotis pyritalis (Hampson, 1912)
Parotis squamopedalis (Guenée, 1854)
Parotis vernalis (Hampson, 1912)
Parotis zambesalis (Walker, 1912)
Parthenodes angularis Hampson, 1897
Parthenodes scotalis Hampson, 1906
Paschiodes mesoleucalis Hampson, 1913
Patissa frontalis (Walker, 1865)
Patissa pulverea (Hampson, 1919)
Patissa virginea (Zeller, 1852)
Pediasia amandusella Błeszyński, 1969
Pediasia contaminella (Hübner, 1796)
Pediasia figuratellus (Walker, 1866)
Pediasia fulvitinctellus (Hampson, 1896)
Pediasia lucrecia Błeszyński, 1969
Phostria albescentalis Hampson, 1918
Piletocera flavalis Hampson, 1917
Piletocera hemiphaealis (Hampson, 1907)
Piletocera signiferalis (Wallengren, 1860)
Pilocrocis glaucitalis Hampson, 1912
Pilocrocis melastictalis Hampson, 1912
Pilocrocis patagialis Hampson, 1909
Pilocrocis pterygodia Hampson, 1912
Pleuroptya aegrotalis (Zeller, 1852)
Pleuroptya balteata (Fabricius, 1798)
Pleuroptya paleacalis (Guenée, 1854)
Polygrammodes phyllophila (Butler, 1878)
Prionapteryx albiceps (Hampson, 1919)
Prionapteryx albimaculalis (Hampson, 1919)
Prionapteryx albofascialis (Hampson, 1919)
Prionapteryx alternalis Maes, 2002
Prionapteryx argentescens (Hampson, 1919)
Prionapteryx brevivittalis Hampson, 1919
Prionapteryx molybdella (Hampson, 1919)
Prochoristis calamochroa (Hampson, 1919)
Psara aprepia (Hampson, 1913)
Psara atritermina (Hampson, 1913)
Psara basalis (Walker, 1866)
Psara pallidalis (Hampson, 1913)
Pseudocatharylla angolica Błeszyński, 1964
Pseudocatharylla auricinctalis (Walker, 1863)
Pseudocatharylla calypso Bassi, 1999
Pseudocatharylla flavipedellus (Zeller, 1852)
Pseudocatharylla polyxena Błeszyński, 1964
Pseudocatharylla xymena Błeszyński, 1964
Pseudonoorda ecthaemata (Hampson, 1913)
Pseudonoorda rubricostalis (Hampson, 1910)
Ptochostola metascotiella Hampson, 1919
Ptychopseustis lophopedalis (de Joannis, 1927)
Pycnarmon albivittalis (Hampson, 1912)
Pycnarmon cribrata (Fabricius, 1794)
Pycnarmon diaphana (Cramer, 1779)
Pycnarmon meritalis (Walker, 1859)
Pygospila tyres (Cramer, 1780)
Pyrausta admensalis (Walker, 1859)
Pyrausta adsocialis (Zeller, 1852)
Pyrausta albialis (Walker, 1859)
Pyrausta apicalis (Hampson, 1913)
Pyrausta bilineaterminalis Maes, 2009
Pyrausta cinnamomealis (Wallengren, 1860)
Pyrausta diatoma Hampson, 1913
Pyrausta diniasalis (Walker, 1859)
Pyrausta gemmiferalis (Zeller, 1852)
Pyrausta haematidalis Hampson, 1913
Pyrausta lithosialis Hampson, 1899
Pyrausta olesialis (Walker, 1859)
Pyrausta orbitalis (Felder & Rogenhofer, 1875)
Pyrausta perfervidalis Hampson, 1913
Pyrausta phaenicealis (Hübner, 1818)
Pyrausta procillusalis (Walker, 1859)
Pyrausta rufinalis (Felder & Rogenhofer, 1875)
Pyrausta rufitincta Hampson, 1913
Salbia haemorrhoidalis (Guenée, 1854)
Sameodes cancellalis (Zeller, 1852)
Sameodes microspilalis Hampson, 1913
Sameodesma undilinealis Hampson, 1918
Sameodesma xanthocraspia (Hampson, 1913)
Sceliodes laisalis (Walker, 1859)
Schoenobius attenuata Hampson, 1919
Schoenobius caminarius Zeller, 1852
Schoenobius forficella (Thunberg, 1794)
Scirpophaga incertulas (Walker, 1863)
Scirpophaga occidentella (Walker, 1863)
Sebrus absconditus Bassi, 1995
Sebrus pseudosparsellus (Błeszyński, 1961)
Spoladea recurvalis (Fabricius, 1775)

Stemorrhages sericea (Drury, 1773)
Syllepte butlerii (Dewitz, 1881)
Syllepte mesoleucalis Hampson, 1898
Syllepte mysisalis (Walker, 1859)
Syllepte nasonalis Hampson, 1898
Syllepte orbiferalis Hampson, 1898
Syllepte ovialis (Walker, 1859)
Syllepte patagialis (Zeller, 1852)
Syllepte polycymalis Hampson, 1912
Syllepte purpurascens Hampson, 1899
Syllepte rogationis Hampson, 1918
Syllepte straminea (Butler, 1875)
Syllepte trifidalis Hampson, 1908
Syllepte xylocraspis (Hampson, 1912)
Synclera traducalis (Zeller, 1852)
Syngamia liquidalis (Zeller, 1852)
Tegostoma bipartalis Hampson, 1896
Tegostoma comparalis (Hübner, 1796)
Tegostoma florilegarium (Guenée, 1857)
Tegostoma subditalis Zeller, 1852
Tegostoma subterminalis Hampson, 1918
Terastia margaritis (Felder & Rogenhofer, 1875)
Terastia meticulosalis Guenée, 1854
Thliptoceras polygrammodes Hampson, 1899
Trichophysetis flavimargo (Warren, 1897)
Trichophysetis whitei Rebel, 1906
Udea ferrugalis (Hübner, 1796)
Udea hageni Viette, 1952
Udea infuscalis (Zeller, 1852)
Udeoides muscosalis (Hampson, 1913)
Udeoides nolalis (Felder & Rogenhofer, 1875)
Ulopeza conigeralis Zeller, 1852
Ulopeza denticulalis Hampson, 1912
Viettessa margaritalis (Hampson, 1910)
Zebronia phenice (Cramer, 1780)

Crambidae

Moths of Africa